The History of Western Education is a 1921 book by a Scottish educator William Boyd, head of the Department of Education at Glasgow University in the first half of the 20th century.

The work has been described as a "immensely successful" and "classic", and received ten editions between 1921 and 1972.

The 4th edition has been described as having "established itself as a standard work in the field of educational history".

The 7th edition has been expanded b Edmund J. King.

References 

1921 non-fiction books
Books about education